Jegălia is a commune in Călărași County, Muntenia, Romania. It is composed of three villages: Gâldău, Iezeru and Jegălia. As of 2011, Jegălia had a population of 4,229.

The commune is located in the southeastern part of the county, in the southern reaches of the Bărăgan Plain. It borders the Borcea branch of the Danube River to the south, Unirea commune to the west, Perișoru commune to the north, and Borcea commune to the east.

Jegălia is traversed by national road , which runs from the county seat, Călărași,  to the east, to Fetești, a city in Ialomița County,  to the east. There is also a train station that serves the CFR Line 800, which connects Bucharest to the Black Sea coast.

References

Communes in Călărași County
Localities in Muntenia